Hoya persicina is an endemic species of porcelainflower or wax plant found in the Philippines is an Asclepiad species of flowering plant in the dogbane family Apocynaceae described in 2012 by Kloppenburg, et al.. Hoya persicina belongs to the genus Hoya. The species corolla in its flower is peach-colored.

Etymology
The specific epithet in the scientific name, persicina was due to the species peach-colored corolla.

References

persicina
Endemic flora of the Philippines
persicina